Theodore Ransom Scowden (June 8, 1815, Pennsylvania – December 31, 1881, Cleveland, Ohio) was an engineer and architect. He designed the Louisville Water Tower with his assistant Charles Hermany. He also designed waterworks for Cleveland and Cincinnati.

He was the son of Theodore Scowden II and Sarah Ransom Hazard of Pittsburgh, Pennsylvania and was educated at Augusta College in Kentucky.

His designs for the Louisville Water Works may have been based on Philadelphia’s Fairmount Water Works (1812). The design is described as being an example of Palladian architecture. The buildings were renovated for conversion into the Louisville WaterWorks Museum.

References

Further reading
Journal of the American Water Works Association, Volume 2, page 58, 1915, Water-supply engineering

1815 births
1881 deaths
19th-century American engineers
19th-century American architects
Augusta College (Kentucky) alumni